Dokle is a surname. Notable people with the surname include:

Namik Dokle (born 1946), Albanian politician 
Zehrudin Dokle (born 1952), Albanian actor and director